CKBF-FM is a Canadian radio station, which broadcasts at 104.1 FM and online at CFB Suffield in the province of Alberta. The station airs a mixture of news and music programming, some produced locally for British and Canadian personnel stationed at the base, and some syndicated from the British Forces Broadcasting Service for personnel of the British Army Training Unit Suffield.

The station was licensed by the Canadian Radio-television and Telecommunications Commission on May 1, 2000.

In 2019, the CRTC approved an application to add a second transmitter for this station, on 107.1 MHz with an ERP of 920 watts, to address reception difficulties in some portions of the air base.

References

External links
 

KBF
KBF
KBF
Radio stations established in 2000
2000 establishments in Alberta